The Chester River is a major tributary of the Chesapeake Bay on the Delmarva Peninsula. Thus the total watershed area is 20% water. It forms the border between Kent County and Queen Anne's County, Maryland, with its headwaters extending into New Castle County and Kent County, Delaware. Chestertown, the seat of Maryland's Kent County, is located on its north shore. It is located south of the Sassafras River and north of Eastern Bay, and is connected with Eastern Bay through Kent Narrows.

The Chester River begins at Millington, Maryland, where Cypress Branch and Andover Branch join together. It ends at the Chesapeake Bay in a very wide mouth between Love Point on Kent Island, and Swan Point, near Gratitude, Maryland. Cypress Branch rises in southwestern New Castle County, Delaware, and  Andover Branch, with its tributary, Sewell Branch, rises in northwestern Kent County, Delaware. Millington is the head of navigation.  Sewell Branch and Andover Branch join in a private impoundage of approximately  about two miles (3 km) above joining with Cypress Branch and then becoming the Chester River.

Its main tributaries are Langford Creek and Morgan Creek on the north side and the Corsica River and Southeast Creek on the south side. There are also several small creeks on the northern shore, including Church Creek, Grays Inn Creek, Shippen Creek, Jarrett Creek, Browns Creek, Broad Creek, Dam Creek, Morgan Creek, Radcliffe Creek, and Mills Branch. On the southern shore the small creeks include Queenstown Creek, Tilghman Creek, Reed Creek, Grove Creek, Hambleton Creek, Rosin Creek, Foreman Branch and Unicorn Branch.

History
Local lore has it that in 1774, colonists boarded a British ship anchored in the Chester River at Chester Town, also called New Town on Chester, and threw its load of tea overboard, mimicking the Boston Tea Party and its act of defiance against King George III.  This came to be known as the Chestertown Tea Party.

While primary source documents show that Chestertown residents did have at least one meeting to discuss the presence of tea aboard the locally owned merchantman Geddes, and later the residents sent food to aid the blockaded Bostonians, contemporaneous source material has yet to be found.

References

United States Geological Survey. 7.5 minute series topographic quadrangles.
Chesapeake Bay Program Watershed Profile Lower Chester River
Chesapeake Bay Program Watershed Profile Middle Chester River
Chesapeake Bay Program Watershed Profile Upper Chester River

External links
Chester River Association 
Maryland DNR's Surf Your Watershed : Lower Chester River
Maryland DNR's Surf Your Watershed : Middle Chester River
Maryland DNR's Surf Your Watershed : Upper Chester River

Tributaries of the Chesapeake Bay
Rivers of Maryland
Rivers of Kent County, Maryland
Rivers of Queen Anne's County, Maryland